Taoyuan District (Bunun: Ngani) is a mountain indigenous district of Kaohsiung City, Taiwan. It is the largest district in Kaohsiung City by area and the least densely populated district in Taiwan.

The population is mainly the indigenous Bunun people and Saaroa people.

Name

Geography
It is the district that is most mountainous and most distant from the city center. The population density in Taoyuan District is one of the least in Taiwan, but the area of the district is the sixth largest. Both Yushan National Park and Maolin National Scenic Area are situated in this district. Taoyuan District is very mountainous with very little flat land. Laonong River passes through Taoyuan District and is an important water source for Kaohsiung. The climate of the Taoyuan district is a tropical monsoon climate.

History
After the war, the aboriginal area was renamed Yani Township (also spelled as ).

On 1 July 1957, Yani Township was renamed Taoyuan Township.

In 2010, Taoyuan Township was elevated to Taoyuan District.

Quick facts 
Area: 928.98 km2.
Population: 4,258 people (February 2023)
Divisions: 8 urban villages and 39 neighborhoods
Postal Code: 848
Households: 1,325

Administrative divisions

Economy
Agriculture produces of the district are vegetables, fruits, processed agricultural products, prunes, jelly fig products and flowers.

Tourist attractions
 Tengjhih National Forest Recreation Area
 Xiangyang Mountain
 Yushan National Park

Notable natives
 Tseng Shu-o, famous football player

See also
 Kaohsiung

References

External links

 

Districts of Kaohsiung